Agnieszka Pachałko (born 18 December 1973) is a Polish model and beauty queen who was crowned Miss Polish 1993, Miss Miss Polish Audience 1993 and Miss International 1993 is the second Pole, which it did (after Agnieszka Kotlarska in 1991).

Pachalko graduated from High School in Inowrocław. Her mother is a retired biology teacher and her father Leon is a retired physical education teacher in the High School.

In 1993, Agnes took first place in a beauty contest Miss Polish. It turned out to be a ticket to the world of fashion. In 1994–1999 she worked as a model in Paris, presenting the collections include: Karl Lagerfeld, Chanel, Yves Saint Laurent, Pierre Cardin, Nina Ricci, Loris Azzaro and Luis Ferrau, working alongside such models as: Claudia Schiffer, Linda Evangelista, Carla Bruni and Karen Mulder. In January 1999 was on the cover of a magazine CKM. After returning to the Polish company founded her own clothing.

References

Polish female models
1973 births
Living people
Miss International winners
Miss International 1993 delegates
Polish beauty pageant winners
People from Inowrocław